The Blade of Allectus is a 1980 fantasy role-playing game adventure for DragonQuest published by Simulations Publications, Inc.

Contents
The Blade of Allectus is an adventure in which a duke has mysterious vanished, believed to be captured by the inhabitants of a magic island.

Reception
Ron Pehr reviewed The Blade of Allectus in The Space Gamer No. 40. Pehr commented that "The Blade of Allectus should be judged on what it does - provides an exciting time for all. It you use DragonQuest rules, The Blade of Allectus should please you."

References

DragonQuest
Fantasy role-playing game adventures
Role-playing game supplements introduced in 1980